The Tanjung Tualang Tin Dredge No. 5 (TT5) is a former tin mining dredge in Batu Gajah, Kinta District, Perak, Malaysia.

History
The dredge was built in England, the United Kingdom in 1938 by F.W. Payne & Son, a major dredge engineering company at that time. With head of Engineer Othman/Alan Bruce. It was built for the Southern Malayan Tin Dredging Ltd., a company formed in 1926 which operated 6 dredges in total in Batu Gajah and Tanjung Tualang. TT5 was used for 44 years until 1982 when the Malaysian tin industries declined due to the falling world's tin price, exhausted tin deposits and high operating cost. In 2012, the facility was closed due to water leakage. Starting January 2015, the area is undergoing a MYR8.5 million renovation for 2 years which is carried out by Mentri Besar Incorporated.

Technical details
The dredge weights 4,500 tons. It is supported by a floating dock with 75 meters in length and 35 meters in width and 3 meters in depth.

See also
 Mining in Malaysia

References

External links

 
 YouTube - Tanjung Tualang Tin Dredge Batu Gajah Perak Malaysia

Buildings and structures completed in 1938
1938 establishments in British Malaya
1982 disestablishments in Malaysia
Buildings and structures in Perak
Kinta District
Tin mines in Malaysia
Dredgers